"Country Girl" is a 1959 single by Faron Young, written by Roy Drusky.  The single was Young's fourth number one on the country chart. "Country Girl" stayed on the charts for thirty-two weeks. The B-side, "I Hear You Talkin'", peaked at number twenty-seven on the country chart.

References

1959 singles
Faron Young songs
1959 songs